A.S.D. Torrecuso Calcio was an Italian football club based in Torrecuso, Campania.It played in Italy's Serie D.

History

Foundation 
The club was founded in 1962.

Serie D 
In the season 2012–13 the team was promoted for the first time, from Eccellenza Campania/B to Serie D.

Colors and badge 
The team's colors were red and blue.

References

External links
Official website 

Association football clubs established in 1962
Football clubs in Campania
Italian football clubs established in 1962